Orchestre Rock-a-Mambo was an African jazz band from Brazzaville of the 1950s. It was a studio band of the Esengo music studio.

It was reconstituted in 1963 under former member Philippe "Rossignol" Lando.  This version, which lasted until the 1970s, was a launching pad for young musicians including Bopol, Wuta Mayi, Camille "Checain" Lola, and Henriette Borauzima.

The band often merged with the musicians from the African Jazz band and sometimes produced recordings under the title ""African Rock".

The band name is a pun with the Kongolese word rocamambu "the one who looks for problems". In a Kongolese folk tale, Rocamambu is a kind of prodigal son, who runs from home and comes back rich.

Discography
Rock-a-Mambo music appears on the following albums and compilations.
AFRICAN RETRO vol. 5 Pathé Marconi - EMI 2 C064-15962
AFRICAN RETRO Vol 6 Pathé Marconi - EMI 2 C064-15978 
AFRICAN MEMORIES Pathé Marconi - EMI 2C062-15136; also C062-15810

EPs
Orchestre Rock-A-Mambo [Columbia ESRF 1460; also ESDF1321]
Rossignol et l'Orchestre Rock 'A Mambo [Columbia ESRF 1793; also ESDF 1321]
Orchestre Rock-A-Mambo[ESRF 1415; also ESDF 1343]
Orchestre Rock-A-Mambo volume 2, ESDF 1372
Nino et l'Orchestre Rock-A-Mambo volume 3 [Columbia ESDF 1380]
GROUPES CHOC DES ANNEES 50s ESDF 1372
CONGO LATINO Columbia ESDF 1401
ORCHESTRE ROCK-A-MAMBO NO 4 (Columbia ESDF 1403; orig: Esengo)

Singles
A large number of singles were recorded by the Esengo studio.

References

Jazz ensembles
Soukous groups
Musical groups established in the 1950s
Cultural organisations based in the Republic of the Congo
Culture in Brazzaville